Dylan Thomas Smith (born 26 February 1994) in Durban, is a South African professional rugby union player for the  in the United Rugby Championship and the  in the Currie Cup His regular position is loosehead prop.

Career

He was once again selected in the squad for the 2012 tournament, held in Port Elizabeth, and also called up into the South Africa Schools squad, although he failed to make any appearances for them.

After finishing school, he joined the Golden Lions Academy and he was the first-choice loosehead prop for the  team that participated in the 2013 Under-19 Provincial Championship Group A. Smith played in eleven of their twelve matches during the pool stages as they finished in second spot on the log.

At the start of 2014, he was included in the  squad for the 2014 Vodacom Cup.

He was the first-choice loosehead prop for the  during the 2015 Vodacom Cup competition.

On 16 March 2021, Smith moves to France to join Stade Francais as a medical joker in the Top 14 for the 2020-21 season.

Honours
 Super Rugby runner up (2) 2016, 2018
 RFU Championship champion 2021-22

References

South African rugby union players
Living people
South African people of British descent
1994 births
Rugby union players from Durban
Rugby union props
Golden Lions players
White South African people
Lions (United Rugby Championship) players
Stade Français players
Ealing Trailfinders Rugby Club players
Bulls (rugby union) players
Blue Bulls players